Elmer Phillips (11 October 1901 – 3 July 1956) was a Guyanese cricketer. He played in eight first-class matches for British Guiana from 1921 to 1927.

See also
 List of Guyanese representative cricketers

References

External links
 

1901 births
1956 deaths
Guyanese cricketers
Guyana cricketers
Sportspeople from Georgetown, Guyana